Ghost Town Anthology is a 2019 French-language Canadian supernatural drama film directed by Denis Côté. It was selected to compete for the Golden Bear at the 69th Berlin International Film Festival. The film is an adaptation of the 2015 novel by Quebec writer Laurence Oliver.

Set in the small town of Sainte-Irénée-les-Neiges, Quebec, the film centres on the inhabitants of the town who are struggling to cope after Simon Dubé, the teenage son of an area family, is killed in a car accident. As the family and town grieve, however, the residents begin to report a number of ghost sightings.

Cast
 Robert Naylor
 Jocelyne Zucco
 Diane Lavallée
 Josée Deschênes
 Larissa Corriveau
 Rachel Graton

Awards

References

External links
 
 

2019 films
2019 drama films
Canadian drama films
Films directed by Denis Côté
Canadian ghost films
Films based on Canadian novels
French-language Canadian films
2010s Canadian films